Amy Kaplan (September 10, 1953 – July 30, 2020) was an American academic working in the interdisciplinary field of American Studies, her work focused on the critical study of the culture of imperialism, prison writing, mourning, memory, and war. Kaplan was Edward W. Kane Professor of English at the University of Pennsylvania, and president of the American Studies Association in 2003.

Education and career
Kaplan graduated summa cum laude from Brandeis University with a BA. She completed her PhD at Johns Hopkins University, where she researched late-nineteenth-century American literature. Her 1982 thesis was titled "Realism against itself: the urban fictions of Twain, Howells, Dreiser, and Dos Passos". In 1994, she co-edited Cultures of United States Imperalism with Donald E. Pease, a book which has been credited with marking "a paradigm shift for the field of American Studies, forcing scholars to contend with the United States' imperialist history".

Kaplan was a professor of English and chair of the American Studies program at Mount Holyoke College before joining the department of English at the University of Pennsylvania in 2003. For the 2011–12 academic year, Kaplan was a member of the school of social sciences at the Institute for Advanced Study in Princeton, New Jersey.

Kaplan died on July 30, 2020.

Selected works
 Kaplan, Amy. The Social Construction of American Realism. The University of Chicago Press, (1988).
 Kaplan, Amy. "Romancing the empire: The embodiment of American masculinity in the popular historical novel of the 1890s." American Literary History 2.4 (1990): 659–690.
 Kaplan, Amy, and Donald E. Pease. Cultures of United States Imperialism. Duke University Press, (1993).
 Kaplan, Amy. "Manifest domesticity." American literature 70.3 (1998): 581–606.
 Kaplan, Amy. "Homeland insecurities: Some reflections on language and space." Radical History Review 85.1 (2003): 82–93.
 Kaplan, Amy. "Violent Belongings and the Question of Empire Today." American Quarterly 56.1 (2004): 1-18.
 Kaplan, Amy. "Where is Guantanamo?." American Quarterly 57.3 (2005): 831–858.
 Kaplan, Amy. The Anarchy of Empire in the Making of U.S. Culture. Harvard University Press, (2005).
 Kaplan, Amy. Our American Israel: The Story of an Entangled Alliance. Harvard University Press, (2018).

Notes

1953 births
2020 deaths
University of Pennsylvania faculty
Brandeis University alumni
Johns Hopkins University alumni
American studies scholars
American literary theorists
Institute for Advanced Study visiting scholars
Mount Holyoke College faculty